Monbeg is a townland  north-west of Enniscorthy, Ireland, in County Wexford. The population is about 101 inhabitants. There are views of surrounding areas from Monbeg Lane. The name Monbeg is derived from the Irish Mhuine Bheag, which means Mossy Fen.

References

Townlands of County Wexford